Ernest William Taylor (20 February 1869 – 9 April 1936) was a rugby union player who represented England from 1892 to 1899. He also captained the national team.

Taylor, nicknamed Little Billie, made his international debut on 6 February 1892 at Whalley Range, Greater Manchester, against Ireland. He played his final international match on 4 February 1899, at Lansdowne Road, again against Ireland. Of his 14 international matches his team won 7.

References

1869 births
1936 deaths
England international rugby union players
English rugby union players
Rugby union halfbacks
Rugby union players from Newcastle upon Tyne